The 1935 SANFL Grand Final was an Australian rules football competition.  beat  99 to 91.

References 

SANFL Grand Finals
SANFL Grand Final, 1935